City of Thieves is a 2008 historical fiction novel by David Benioff. It is, in part, a coming of age story set in the World War II siege of Leningrad. It follows the adventures of two youths as they desperately search for a dozen eggs at the behest of a Soviet NKVD officer, a task that takes them far behind enemy lines. It was released by Plume on May 15, 2008.

The audiobook, narrated by Ron Perlman, was released by Penguin Audio on January 8, 2009.

Plot
The novel begins with David as the narrator. He is an American who describes himself as growing up knowing that his grandfather killed two Germans in a knife fight before he was 18, even though he was never actually told the story. As a child, David lived two blocks away from his grandparents, who owned an insurance company. In the late 1990s, an insurance conglomerate offered to purchase the company, and David's grandmother asked them to double their offer. Eventually, the conglomerate agreed and David's grandparents retired to Florida. David lives in Los Angeles writing screenplays, but when he was asked to write an autobiographical essay, he decided he wanted to write instead about Leningrad, where his grandfather grew up. He flies to Florida to speak with his grandfather, and for a week David records his grandfather's stories. The reader also learns that David's grandmother never cooks herself anything more complex than a bowl of cereal.

The narrator changes to Lev (David's grandfather) and it's New Year's Eve in 1942 in Leningrad, Russia, during World War II. Everyone's been hungry since the German siege of the city began in September, although many, including Lev's mother and sister Taisya, have evacuated. Lev, at 17, is a firefighter for the city, and sits on the roof of his apartment building with his friends Vera, Grisha, and Oleg. Vera spots a German soldier falling from the sky in a parachute and the four run down into the street to investigate. When the German lands in the street, Lev takes the man's knife while Grisha opens the man's hip flask and passes it around, toasting the cold that killed this soldier. Suddenly they hear a car coming and run, because what they’re doing is illegal. As they race back to the apartment building, Vera falls. Lev goes back to help her and boosts her over the gate, but the Russian soldiers out on patrol grab Lev before he can climb over himself. The soldiers take him to the Crosses, the prison in Leningrad.

After hours in his pitch dark prison cell, Lev has come to the grim conclusion that he'll never be a great Russian, since he feels half-broken after just his short time in prison. He hears guards coming, the cell door opens, and a young soldier is ushered into the cell. When they are alone, the young man introduces himself as Kolya, who was accused of desertion, but he tells Lev that in fact he was defending his thesis on Ushakovo's The Courtyard Hound, a book and author whom Lev has never heard of.

The next morning, Lev and Kolya are taken to a mansion where the NKVD—the Russian secret police—are stationed. There, Colonel Grechko tasks them with finding a dozen eggs to make a cake for the Colonel’s daughter's wedding the following Friday. He confiscates Lev and Kolya's ration cards and sends them off with a letter saying they shouldn't be stopped or harassed.

Lev and Kolya decide that the Haymarket, which is entirely black market, is the place to start. As they walk there, Kolya teases Lev about being a virgin and begins to explain his theory of calculated neglect to him, which he learned from The Courtyard Hound. They don't find eggs in the Haymarket, but a very large man approaches them and says that he has eggs at his apartment. The giant leads them to an apartment building and refuses to bring the eggs down to the street. Kolya cheerfully agrees to do business in the giant's apartment even after the man admits to being a murderer, but when Lev and Kolya enter the giant's apartment, they discover that the giant and the giant’s wife are cannibals. Lev and Kolya manage to escape unscathed.

Kolya and Lev decide to stay at the latter's apartment that night, but when they turn on the street where the building is, they find the apartment building has been reduced to a pile of rubble. Kolya then leads Lev to the apartment of a friend, Sonya, where she welcomes them warmly and introduces them to the doctors also staying with her. Lev sleeps that night in the living room and listens to Kolya and Sonya have sex in the next room, thinking that it’s the loneliest sound in the world.

The following morning, Lev and Kolya decide to investigate a rumor that they heard in the Haymarket that there's an old man keeping chickens on a roof. They get into the old man's building by offering to carry buckets of ice for two girls who live there. When Lev and Kolya get to the roof and find the coop, they open the door to discover that the old man has been dead for days, and the chickens are gone. His grandson, Vadim, is still guarding the absent chickens and is very weak. Vadim refuses Lev and Kolya's offers of help and finally offers them the last chicken he'd been keeping warm under his coat. They take the chicken back to Sonya's apartment and debate how long it'll take for her to lay a dozen eggs. During this time, Lev reveals that his father was Abraham Beniov, a famous poet who was arrested by the NKVD and never returned. Timofei, one of the doctors, returns to Sonya's apartment and incredulously explains to the others that the chicken is actually a rooster and will never lay eggs. So, that night, they cobble together a fabulous chicken soup.

Kolya wakes Lev the next morning and informs him they're going to walk to Mga, where there's a poultry collective that's surely being kept functional by the Germans. As they walk, Kolya shares more about The Courtyard Hound and they discuss Lev's father. They hear a howl and follow the sound, eventually coming across a clearing littered with dead dogs. One is still alive. Kolya slits the dog's throat and explains that the dogs were strapped to bombs and intended to blow up German tanks, but were shot by the Germans instead.

Lev and Kolya continue their march to Mga, although as night falls, Kolya admits they're going the wrong way. Lev notices a farmhouse with lit windows and decides that he's going to try to stay there for the night. He and Kolya creep up to the house and peer in a window. They see four teenage girls dancing inside, and Kolya looks angry. Kolya knocks on the door and has a short standoff with one of the girls, and Lev finally realizes that the girls are being kept by the Germans as sex slaves. Lev and Kolya make peace with them, however, and the girls offer them food and share that the soldiers who visit them are Einsatzgruppen (Nazi death squads).

Kolya asks the girls why they don't walk away, and Lara tells them about Zoya, who was a young girl who was captured with this group of girls. She tried to run away one day, and to punish her, Abendroth, the Einsatzgruppen officer in charge, made the others watch as he sawed Zoya's feet off. Lev and Kolya decide to try to kill the Nazis when they come later that night.

Lev is terrified, and Kolya offers him a pack of playing cards with naked women on them to distract from his fear. The Nazis arrive earlier than expected, but are ambushed by Russian partisan fighters outside. The partisans almost shoot Lev and Kolya as well, but finally agree not to. Lev, meanwhile, is surprised and intrigued to find that their best sniper, Vika, is female.

Korsakov, the partisans' leader, gives everyone an hour to warm up and then they all depart the farmhouse. The girls head south and Lev and Kolya follow the partisans to try to hunt Abendroth. As they walk, Kolya tells Lev more about The Courtyard Hound and Lev asks Kolya if he's writing it. Kolya doesn't deny this theory. They soon come across villages that the Einsatzgruppen are burning and head for a nearby safe house to sleep. While everyone is sleeping, Kolya explains to Lev that he was actually accused of desertion because he spent New Year's Eve trying to find a woman in Leningrad to have sex with, but he grossly miscalculated how much time he had to get back to his squad.

The next morning, the partisan on guard duty wakes everyone, yelling that the Germans are coming. They all try to run but it's too late. Korsakov is killed. Lev tries to hide. Vika, Kolya, and a partisan named Markov find him, but the Germans are still approaching. Vika decides they should try to infiltrate the group of prisoners who are with the Germans, and they successfully do so, but then one of the prisoners starts yelling that Markov is a partisan, and the Germans shoot Markov.

When the company reaches a schoolhouse, an Einsatzgruppen officer tests the prisoners' literacy. Lev, Kolya, and Vika all pretend to be illiterate. All the literate prisoners are shot and the rest are squeezed into a toolshed for the night. The following morning when the Nazis move the prisoners out of the shed, they discover that the prisoner who betrayed Markov had been murdered in the night. As they march that day, Kolya suggests that Vika certainly killed the man, and is likely NKVD. A convoy of German vehicles passes the prisoners, but one of the artillery vehicles breaks down, and all the German soldiers take the excuse to stop and urinate. Vika points out Abendroth's car at the end of the convoy and Kolya, who speaks German, approaches a group of soldiers and begins to banter with them. When he returns to Lev and Vika, he said that he bet their lives and a dozen eggs on Lev winning a chess match against Abendroth.

That night, Abendroth calls for Lev, Vika, and Kolya. He's a hulking man but very smart and sees through their ruse, stating that Lev is a Jew, Vika is female, and they're all certainly literate. He finally agrees to the match and adds a dozen eggs to the pot per Kolya's request. The three are searched but the young soldier who searches them misses their hidden knives.

Lev wins the chess game against Abendroth, and realizes it's going to be up to him to stab Abendroth. He makes his move and a fight ensues. He kills Abendroth and the soldier fighting Kolya, losing his left index finger in the process. Vika grabs the Germans' guns, Kolya grabs the box of eggs, and the three jump out the window and run for the woods. When Leningrad is in sight, Vika asks Lev for his full name so she can find him later, kisses him, and leaves to find another group of partisans.

When Lev and Kolya reach the defenses of Leningrad the next morning, the soldiers on duty shoot at them and hit Kolya in one of his buttocks. When the lieutenant realizes that Kolya and Lev are working for Colonel Grechko, he loads Kolya and Lev into a truck and heads quickly for the hospital, afraid of making a powerful enemy. Kolya is incensed at having been shot by his own people but tries to tell Lev that everything's going to be fine. As Kolya's lips turn blue, it becomes obvious that Kolya is going to die. He smiles at Lev and Lev wishes he could make a joke.

Lev delivers the eggs to Colonel Grechko later that morning and discovers that Grechko has already procured three dozen other eggs. Colonel Grechko grants Lev two ration cards and tells him he'll live a long life by keeping his mouth shut.

The German siege is lifted in January of 1944. In 1945, Lev is in his apartment reading when he hears a knock at the door. He answers it, and Vika is standing in the hallway with her suitcase and a dozen eggs. Lev suggests they make an omelet, and Vika states that she doesn't cook (thus revealing that she is narrator's grandmother).

Reception
The book was well received by most critics, including Jesse Berrett of SFGate and Boris Fishman of The New York Times. According to Jennifer Reese of Entertainment Weekly, "Benioff has produced a funny, sad, and thrilling novel. A-". However, Donna Rifkind of Los Angeles Times wrote that while the book "features a snappy plot, a buoyant friendship, a quirky courtship, an assortment of menacing bad guys, an atmosphere that flickers between grainy realism and fairy-tale grotesquerie and a grim but irrepressible sense of humor," it left her "thoroughly and discouragingly unmoved."

The novel was also a major artistic inspiration for the post-apocalyptic video game The Last of Us. The game's director Bruce Straley said: "It's nice to be inspired by [...] the right things. City of Thieves is an amazing book. Everybody should check that out." The book makes an appearance in the sequel, The Last of Us Part II, where the character Abby is seen reading the book. Abby, later in the game, meets a boy named Lev, who then becomes a major protagonist in her narrative arc.

References

2008 American novels
American historical novels
Black comedy books
Novels set in Saint Petersburg
Novels set in the Stalin era
Novels set during World War II
Novels by David Benioff